CF Intersport-Aroma Cobusca Nouă  was a Moldovan football club based in Cobusca Nouă, Anenii Noi, Moldova. They played in the Divizia A, the second tier of Moldovan football. In the 2011–12 season, Intersport-Aroma placed 4th in the league. This was the best result in their history.

External links
Intersport-Aroma on Soccerway.com
Club profile at weltfussballarchiv.com

Football clubs in Moldova
Association football clubs established in 2000
CF Intersport-Aroma Cobusca Nouă
Association football clubs disestablished in 2017
Defunct football clubs in Moldova